The Thanksgiving Day Disaster took place in San Francisco on November 29, 1900, at the annual college football game between the California Golden Bears and the Stanford Cardinal, also known as The Big Game. A large crowd of people who did not want to pay the $1 (equivalent of $ today) admission fee gathered upon the roof of a glass blowing factory to watch for free. The roof collapsed, spilling many spectators onto a furnace. Twenty-three people were killed, and over 100 more were injured. The disaster remains the deadliest accident at a sporting event in U.S. history.

Background
Every year since 1892, the University of California and the Stanford University football teams have played an annual game towards the end of November or the beginning of December. The event has become known as The Big Game.

The early games in the series were played in San Francisco. Those games suffered at least two calamities. At the 1897 game, portions of a packed grandstand collapsed under the weight of spectators. Nobody was killed, but a 10-year-old boy was hospitalized. 

In 1900, the game took place at the former California League baseball grounds, which local newspapers called the 16th and Folsom Grounds, on Thanksgiving Day, which at the time was the last Thursday in November. The stadium was located in a heavily industrial part of San Francisco. 

Big Games in San Francisco
1892 (two games) through 1894: Haight Street grounds – Stanyan Street; Waller Street; Shrader Street; and Frederic Street 
1895–1896: Central Park – Market Street; 8th Street; Mission Street; 7th Street
1897–1898: Recreation Park – 8th Street; Harrison Street; Gordon Street; Ringold Street 
1899–1901: 16th and Folsom grounds – 16th Street; Folsom Street; 15th Street; and Harrison Street
1902–1903: Richmond district stadium – Lake Street, 7th Avenue, California Street, 8th Avenue
[per the San Francisco Chronicle, November 6, 1903, p.4]

After the 1903 game, the event's location would alternate between the two schools' campuses.

The disaster
On the day of the 1900 game, the San Francisco and Pacific Glass Works company had just opened a new building across 15th Street from the stadium. Because the factory was brand new, only one furnace was active that day. The remaining furnaces were not scheduled to start until the following Monday. It was enclosed by a series of binding rods that resembled croquet hoops.

The kickoff took place at 2:30 p.m. with a crowd of 19,000 spectators watching in the stadium, with thousands more watching in the street. A group of 500 to 1000 people who did not want to pay $1 for a ticket gathered on the factory's roof to watch for free. Factory employees tried to phone the police to turn back the crowd but were instead told to speak to the game's lieutenant. However, the officers stationed at the stadium denied them entry.

The peak of the factory's roof was topped by a ventilator which ran the length of the building, and was not intended to hold the weight of hundreds of people. Approximately 20 minutes after kickoff, the ventilator roof collapsed due to the excessive load.

Of the hundreds of people on the roof, at least 100 people fell four stories to the factory floor. Had the people broken through the furnace, their bodies would have been consumed by the molten glass. Many of the spectators were pinned by the binding rods to the surface of the furnace, making escape more difficult. Fuel pipes were also severed, spraying many victims with scalding hot oil. The fuel also ignited, setting many bodies on fire. Factory employees worked to remove bodies from the furnace, using metal poles to poke bodies out of reach. 

Despite the incident, the game continued, with Stanford winning.

Aftermath

Thirteen people were killed on the day of the disaster, with nine more dying in hospitals in the days that followed. A 28-year-old man succumbed to his injuries three years after the disaster, bringing the final death toll to 23. All of the victims were male, and most were children. 

Many American newspapers reported the incident on the front page. Most of the content in the sports sections was about the game itself. The San Francisco Chronicle referred to the event as the "closest and most exciting game of football ever played by the elevens of the two California universities." Writers for the student newspapers at both universities also paid little attention to the disaster.

The San Francisco Call referred to the incident as "perhaps the most horrifying accident that ever happened in San Francisco".

No physical memorial to the disaster exists, save for a cross at one 12-year-old boy's grave. The site of the disaster is now occupied by a UCSF building.

External links
San Francisco Call newspaper account
San Francisco Chronicle newspaper account
San Francisco Examiner newspaper account

References

November 1900 events
1900 disasters in the United States
Disasters in sports
Building collapses in the United States
History of San Francisco